John Freind may refer to:
Sir John Freind (conspirator) or John Friend (died 1696), English civil servant; executed
John Freind (physician) (1675–1728), English physician
Sir John Freind Robinson, 1st Baronet (1754–1832) English Archdeacon of Armagh

See also
John Friend (disambiguation)